Empusa pennicornis is a species of praying mantis in the family Empusidae.

Subspecies
 E. p. angulata (Uzbekistan)
 E. p. baysunica (Kazakhstan and Uzbekistan)
 E. p. buharica (Uzbekistan)
 E. p. caputobtusa (Tajikistan)
 E. p. condarinica (Tajikistan)
 E. p. copetdagica (Turkmenistan)
 E. p. hodshamuminica (Tajikistán)
 E. p. iliense (Kazakhstan)
 E. p. longoapicale (Kazakhstan)
 E. p. longidorsa (Tajikistan)
 E. p. luppovae (Tajikistan)
 E. p. mujuncumica (Kazakhstan)
 E. p. orientalis (Kazakhstán)
 E. p. similis (Tajikistan)
 E. p. vidorsa (Kazakhstán and Tajikistán)

See also
List of mantis genera and species

References

pennicornis
Insects described in 1773